Charles Leon Tamayo (born ) is a Cuban male artistic gymnast, representing his nation at international competitions.  He participated at world championships, including the 2003 World Artistic Gymnastics Championships in Anaheim, California. He is the first male gymnast from Cuba to win a medal at the World Championships. He also has a move named after him, the Tamayo, which is a "laid-out arabian double front on floor"; he admits he did not invent the move, but because he was the first to compete it, he earns the naming rights.

References

1981 births
Living people
Cuban male artistic gymnasts
Place of birth missing (living people)
Pan American Games medalists in gymnastics
Pan American Games gold medalists for Cuba
Gymnasts at the 2003 Pan American Games
20th-century Cuban people
21st-century Cuban people